Grassland (Persian: علف‌زار, romanized: Alafzar) is a 2022 Iranian drama film directed and written by Kazem Daneshi and produced by Bahram Radan. The film screened for the first time at the 40th Fajr Film Festival and received 8 nominations, 4 awards and an honorary diploma.

Premise 
Sara (Sara Bahrami), the bride of the mayor's family, spends one night with her husband, sister, brother-in-law, sister-in-law in an unusual garden. The noise of their party catches the attention of the thugs in the area. Thugs attack their ceremonies in the most brutal way possible. The women are sexually assaulted and Sara's husband is stabbed to death. The case investigator (Pejman Jamshidi), who is a committed and responsible man, is pressured by the mayor to close the case quietly. But with Sara's complaint and the investigator's honesty, the situation is different.

Cast 

 Sara Bahrami as Sara Bababeigi
 Pejman Jamshidi as Amir Hossein Besharat
 Setareh Pesyani as Shabnam Bababeigi
 Tarlan Parvaneh as Elham
 Mehdi Zaminpardaz as Mohsen Fardi
 Sadaf Espahbodi as Fariba Etehadi
 Erfan Naseri as Mehran
 Yasna Mirtahmaseb as Sajad
 Maedeh Tahmasebi as Hamed's Mother
 Roya Javidnia as Mayor's Wife
 Matin Heydarinia as Hamed
 Farokh Nemati as The Mayor
 Mehran Emambakhsh as The Prosecutor
 Hojjat Hassanpour Sargaroui as Amirhossein
 Elahe Azkari
 Setayesh Rajaeinia
 Mohammad Motazedi
 Mohammad Mehdi Ahadi
 Benyamin Norouzi
 Adrina Toushe
 Hossein Valizadeh
 Ali Amir Khalili
 Arshia Tavakoli
 Sepehr Gandomi

Reception

Critical response

Accolades

References

External links 

 
Iranian drama films
2020s Persian-language films
2022 drama films
2022 films